Bonnington Falls were waterfalls submerged by dams on the Kootenay River between the cities of Castlegar and Nelson, in the West Kootenay region of southern British Columbia. The upper falls was named after the Falls of Clyde upper falls of Bonnington Linn.

In 1896, West Kootenay Power and Light constructed a dam and hydro generating station at the lower falls. In 1908, the City of Nelson hydro dam at the upper falls became operational. In 1976, BC Hydro completed a dam on the Kootenay Canal diversion.

Adjacent to the site of the falls is the unincorporated community of Bonnington Falls, British Columbia.

References

West Kootenay
Waterfalls of British Columbia
Kootenay Land District